is a Japanese speed skater. She competed in the women's 3000 metres at the 1998 Winter Olympics.

References

External links

1974 births
Living people
Japanese female speed skaters
Olympic speed skaters of Japan
Speed skaters at the 1998 Winter Olympics
Sportspeople from Hokkaido
20th-century Japanese women